In Greek mythology, Porphyrion was one of the Gigantes (Giants), who according to Hesiod, were the offspring of Gaia, born from the blood that fell when Uranus (Sky) was castrated by their son Cronus. In some other versions of the myth, the Gigantes were born of Gaia and Tartarus.

Sources
According to the mythographer Apollodorus, Porphyrion was (along with Alcyoneus), the greatest of the Giants, and during the Gigantomachy, the battle between the Giants and the Olympian gods, Porphyrion attacked Heracles and Hera, but Zeus caused Porphyrion to become enamoured of Hera, whom Porphyrion then tried to rape, but Zeus struck Porphyrion with his thunderbolt and Heracles killed him with an arrow. According to Pindar, who calls him "king of the Giants", he was slain by an arrow from the bow of Apollo. Aristophanes' comedy The Birds, contains two brief mentions of Porphyrion. Porphyrion is also mentioned, in the company of other Giants, by the Latin poet Horace.

The late fourth-century AD Latin poet Claudian in his Gigantomachia has Gaia, imagining the Giants victorious, propose that "Porphyrion, wreathe thou thy head with Delphi's laurel and take Cirrah for thy sanctuary", and has Porphyrion attempt "to uproot trembling Delos, wishing to hurl it at the sky". The late fourth or early fifth-century AD Greek poet Nonnus, in his Dionysiaca, has Gaia set the Giants against Dionysus, promising Porphyrion Hebe as his wife should the Giants succeed in subduing the god.

In art
Porphyrion is named on a sixth-century BC black-figure pyxis (Getty 82.AE.26), where he and the Giant Enceladus oppose Zeus, Heracles and Athena. He is also named on a late fifth-century BC red-figure cup from Vulci (Berlin F2531), and a fifth-century BC red-figure krater (Paris, Petit Palais 868), in both engaged in single combat with Zeus, and a late sixth-century/early fifth-century fragmentary BC red-figure cup (British Museum E 47), where his opponent is lost.

Porphyrion was probably named on the Gigantomachy depicted on the north frieze of the Siphnian Treasury at Delphi (c. 525 BC), and he was one of the many Giants depicted on the second-century BC Pergamon Altar Gigantomachy frieze, where he is shown fighting Zeus.

Notes

References
 Apollodorus, Apollodorus, The Library, with an English Translation by Sir James George Frazer, F.B.A., F.R.S. in 2 Volumes. Cambridge, Massachusetts, Harvard University Press; London, William Heinemann Ltd. 1921.  Online version at the Perseus Digital Library.
 Claudian, Claudian with an English translation by Maurice Platnauer, Volume II, Loeb Classical Library No. 136. Cambridge, Massachusetts: Harvard University Press; London: William Heinemann, Ltd.. 1922. . Internet Archive. 
 Arafat, K. W., Classical Zeus: A Study in Art and Literature, Clarendon Press, Oxford 1990. .
 Cook, Arthur Bernard, Zeus: A Study in Ancient Religion, Volume III: Zeus God of the Dark Sky (Earthquakes, Clouds, Wind, Dew, Rain, Meteorites), Part I: Text and Notes, Cambridge University Press 1940. Internet Archive
 Horace, The Odes and Carmen Saeculare of Horace. John Conington. trans. London. George Bell and Sons. 1882. Online version at the Perseus Digital Library.
 Hesiod, Theogony, in The Homeric Hymns and Homerica with an English Translation by Hugh G. Evelyn-White, Cambridge, Massachusetts.,Harvard University Press; London, William Heinemann Ltd. 1914. Online version at the Perseus Digital Library.
 Hyginus, Gaius Julius, The Myths of Hyginus. Edited and translated by Mary A. Grant, Lawrence: University of Kansas Press, 1960.
 Lyne,  R. O. A. M., Horace: Behind the Public Poetry, Yale University Press, 1995. .
 Nonnus, Dionysiaca; translated by Rouse, W H D, III Books XXXVI–XLVIII. Loeb Classical Library No. 346, Cambridge, Massachusetts, Harvard University Press; London, William Heinemann Ltd. 1940. Internet Archive
 Pindar, Odes, Diane Arnson Svarlien. 1990. Online version at the Perseus Digital Library.
 Ridgway, Brunilde Sismondo, Hellenistic Sculpture II: The Styles of ca. 200-100 B.C., University of Wisconsin Press, 2000. .
 Sparks, Brian A., "Aspects of Onesimos" in Greek Art: Archaic Into Classical : a Symposium Held at the University of Cincinnati April 2–3, 1982, BRILL, 1985. .* Stewart, Andrew F., Greek Sculpture: An Exploration, Yale University Press, 1990.

Gigantes
Mythology of Heracles
Children of Gaia